Pezy may refer to :

Places
Pęzy,  a village in the administrative district of Gmina Sokoły, within Wysokie Mazowieckie County, Podlaskie Voivodeship, in north-eastern Poland
Pézy, a former commune in the Eure-et-Loir department in northern France.

Other
PEZY Computing, a japanese fabless computer chip design company